Democratic Federal Yugoslavia, also known as Democratic Federative Yugoslavia (DF Yugoslavia or DFY), was a provisional state established during World War II on 29 November 1943 through the Second Session of the Anti-Fascist Council for the National Liberation of Yugoslavia (AVNOJ). The National Committee for the Liberation of Yugoslavia (NKOJ) was its original executive body. Throughout its existence it was governed by Marshal Josip Broz Tito as prime minister.

It was recognized by the Allies at the Tehran Conference, along with the AVNOJ as its deliberative body. The Yugoslav government-in-exile of  King Peter II in London, partly due to pressure from the United Kingdom, recognized the AVNOJ government with the Treaty of Vis, signed on 16 June 1944 between the prime minister of the government-in-exile, Ivan Šubašić, and Tito. With the Treaty of Vis, the government-in-exile and the NKOJ agreed to merge into a provisional government as soon as possible. The form of the new government was agreed upon in a second Tito–Šubašić agreement signed on 1 November 1944 in the recently liberated Yugoslav capital of Belgrade. DF Yugoslavia became one of the founding members of the United Nations upon the signing of the United Nations Charter in October 1945.

The state was formed to unite the Yugoslav resistance movement to the occupation of Yugoslavia by the Axis powers. The agreement left the issue of whether the state would be a monarchy or a republic intentionally undecided until after the war had ended so the position of head of state was vacant. After the merger of the governments, the state was reformed as a one-party Federal People's Republic of Yugoslavia with Josip Broz Tito as Prime Minister and Ivan Šubašić as minister of foreign affairs.

History
The Second Session of the AVNOJ, held in Jajce in November 1943, opened with a declaration that read in part:
That the Anti-Fascist Council of National Liberation of Yugoslavia be constituted as the supreme legislative and executive representative body of Yugoslavia as the supreme representative of the sovereignty of the peoples and of the State of Yugoslavia as a whole, and that a National Committee of Liberation of Yugoslavia be established as an organ with all of the features of a national government, through which the Anti-Fascist Council of National Liberation of Yugoslavia will realize its executive function.
That the traitorous "government" in exile be deprived of all rights as the legal government of Yugoslavia, particularly of the right to represent the peoples of Yugoslavia anywhere or before anyone.
That all international treaties and obligations concluded abroad in the name of Yugoslavia by the "government" in exile be reviewed with a view to their invalidation or renewal or approval, and that all international treaties and obligations which the so-called "government" in exile may eventually conclude abroad in the future receive no recognition.
That Yugoslavia be established on a democratic federal principle as a state of equal peoples.
The AVNOJ then issued six decrees and the Presidium of the AVNOJ, which continued its functions when it was not in session, followed with four decisions. Together these comprised the constitution of the new state taking shape in Yugoslavia. On 30 November the Presidium gave Tito the rank of Marshal of Yugoslavia and appointed him president of the government (or acting prime minister) and Minister of National Defence. Three vice presidents and thirteen other ministers were appointed to the NKOJ.

The name "Democratic Federative Yugoslavia" was officially adopted on 17 February 1944. On the same day they adopted the five-torch emblem of Yugoslavia.

After the deposition of King Peter II, the Federal People's Republic of Yugoslavia was proclaimed on 29 November 1945.

Government 

Its legislature, after November 1944, was the Provisional Assembly. The Tito-Šubašić agreement of 1944 declared that the state was a pluralist democracy that guaranteed: democratic liberties; personal freedom; freedom of speech, assembly, and religion; and a free press. However, by January 1945 Tito had shifted the emphasis of his government away from emphasis on pluralist democracy, claiming that though he accepted democracy, he claimed there was no "need" for multiple parties, as he claimed that multiple parties were unnecessarily divisive in the midst of Yugoslavia's war effort and that the People's Front represented all the Yugoslav people. The People's Front coalition, headed by the Communist Party of Yugoslavia and its general secretary Marshal Josip Broz Tito, was a major movement within the government. Other political movements that joined the government included the "Napred" movement represented by Milivoje Marković.

Democratic Federal Yugoslavia was ruled by Temporary Government consisting mostly of Unitary National Liberation Front members and small number of other political parties from former Kingdom of Yugoslavia. President of the Government was Josip Broz Tito. Communists held 22 minister positions, including Finances, Internal Affairs, Justice, Transport and others. Ivan Šubašić, from Croatian Peasant Party and former ban of Croatian Banovina, was minister of Foreign Affairs, while Milan Grol, from Democratic Party, was Deputy Prime Minister. Many non-communist government members resigned due to disagreement with the new policy.

Administrative divisions 
Democratic Federal Yugoslavia consisted of 6 federal states and 2 autonomous units:

 Federated State of Serbia
 Autonomous Province of Vojvodina
 Kosovo and Metohija Autonomous Region
 Federated State of Croatia
 Federated State of Bosnia and Herzegovina
 Federated State of Slovenia
 Federated State of Montenegro
 Federated State of Macedonia

References

Sources 

 
 
 
 
 

 
Socialist Yugoslavia
Socialist Federal Republic of Yugoslavia
 Socialist Yugoslavia
States and territories established in 1943

1940s in Kosovo
1940s in Montenegro
1940s in Slovenia
.
States and territories disestablished in 1945
1940s in Serbia